Emmanuel (born Jesús Emmanuel Arturo Acha Martinez, April 16, 1955, in Mexico City) is a Mexican singer who debuted in the 1970s.

Life

He is the son of the Argentinian-born bullfighter Raúl Acha,  "Rovira", who appeared numerous times in the Plaza de Acho in Lima, Peru.  Emmanuel grew up in Chosica, a town about an hour from Lima, and attended Chosica's most prestigious boarding school, the Colegio Santa Rosa, of the Augustinian priests.  His mother was Spanish singer Conchita Martínez.

Emmanuel's songs are usually ballads, which became popular during the 1980s.
His fourth and most successful album to date, Íntimamente (Intimately), was written by the famous Spaniard ballad composer Manuel Alejandro in collaboration with Ana Magdalena. It was released in 1980 and had the following seven hit songs:

 "Todo Se Derrumbó Dentro De Mí" ("Everything Collapsed Inside of Me")
 "Quiero Dormir Cansado" ("I Want to Sleep Tired")
 "El Día Que Puedas" ("The Day You Can")
 "Con Olor A Hierba" ("With the Smell of Grass")
 "Tengo Mucho Que Aprender De Ti" ("I Have A Lot to Learn from You")
 "Insoportablemente Bella" ("Unbearably Beautiful") (cover of Hernaldo Zúñiga's and Rudy Márquez's 1980 hit)
 "Este Terco Corazón" ("This Stubborn Heart")
The remaining songs on the album are "Esa Triste Guitarra" ("That Sad Guitar"), "Caprichosa María" ("Capricious Maria"), and "Eso Era La Vida" ("That Was Life"), the last of which is the only song on the album not composed by Alejandro-Magdalena.

His follow-up albums also enjoyed success with memorable love songs. His Ibero-American number one single "La Chica de Humo" ("The Smoke Girl"), a New jack swing song which became one of the biggest hits throughout 1989, it also became a number one single on the U.S Hot Latin Tracks in the same year. The theme was included on the 1989 album Quisiera. The music video for the song had a constant rotation on the Mexican, Uruguayan and Argentinian music channels and became an eighties classic song in Ibero-America. In 2011, Emmanuel received the Billboard Latin Music Lifetime Achievement Award. Ten years later, he was presented with the Latin Grammy Lifetime Achievement Award. He has also been presented with the Billboard Spirit of Hope Award in 1997 for his work in philanthropy. 

Emmanuel continues to tour throughout Latin America backed by bands that have included musicians from the United States, most notably guitarist Dick Smith of (Earth Wind & Fire, Kenny Loggins, and Air Supply).

Emmanuel's son, Alexander Acha, is a professional singer as well.

Discography

2019: Navidad
2015: Inédito
2007: Retro en Vivo
1999: Sentirme Vivo
1996: Amor Total
1994: Esta Aventura
1993: En Gira
1992: Ese Soy Yo
1990: Vida
1989: Quisiera
1988: Entre Lunas
1986: Desnudo
1984: Emmanuel
1983: En La Soledad
1982: Tú y Yo
1980: Intimamente
1979: Al Final
1977: Amor Sin Final
1976: 10 Razones Para Cantar

Television

2008: Premios TV y novelas (2008)
2008: Emmanuel... La trayectoria
2008: Más vale tarde
2007: Premios TV y novelas (2007)
2006: Aún hay más... Homenaje a Raúl Velasco
2003: De pe a pa
1992: Querida Concha
1992: Ese soy yo
1987: Emmanuel en Las Vegas
1986: Querido amigo
1984: Siempre en domingo
1984: Emmanuel en Acapulco
1983: Emmanuel; si ese tiempo pudiera volver
1978: Festival OTI Sang "El y yo" and "Al Final"
1977: Variedades de media noche
1977: Otra vez Iran Eory

Soundtrack

2001: La Intrusa (Mexican telenovela) TV series aka "Telenovela"
1998: Dance with Me (film)  (performer: "Esa triste guitarra")

References

External links 
 http://www.emmanuel.com.mx
 http://www.universalmusica.com/emmanuel/

Mexican pop singers
1955 births
Living people
Mexican bullfighters
Singers from Mexico City
Universal Music Latin Entertainment artists
Mexican people of Argentine descent
Mexican people of Basque descent
Mexican people of Spanish descent
OTI Festival presenters
20th-century Mexican male singers
21st-century Mexican male singers
Latin Grammy Lifetime Achievement Award winners